The Berrigan Brothers are:
Daniel Berrigan (1921-2016), American peace activist.
Philip Berrigan (1923-2002), American peace activist.